Pristimantis percnopterus is a species of frog in the family Strabomantidae. It is found in the Cordillera del Cóndor and northern Cordillera Central, Peru.
Its natural habitat is humid and semi-arid montane forests. It is threatened by habitat loss (deforestation).

References

percnopterus
Amphibians of Peru
Endemic fauna of Peru
Amphibians described in 1999
Taxonomy articles created by Polbot